HD 157819 is the Henry Draper Catalogue designation for a star in the southern constellation of Ara. It is faintly visible to the naked eye at an apparent visual magnitude of 5.94 and is approximately  distant from the Earth. The spectrum of this star fits a stellar classification of G8 II-III, indicating it is a G-type star that is somewhere between the giant and bright giant stages of its evolution.

References

External links
 HR 6487
 CCDM J17286-5510
 Image HD 157819

Ara (constellation)
157819
Double stars
G-type bright giants
6487
085520
Durchmusterung objects